Zenda Swabhimanacha (Marathi: झेंडा स्वाभिमानाचा) is a 2017 Marathi language drama film which is directed by Vishwas Baban Ranjane. The screenplay highlights the current education system.

Cast 

 Teshwani Vetal 
 Akshay Kharat
 Prakash Dhotre
 Sonal Godbole 
 Ramchandra Dhumal 
 Sikandar Mulani 
 Subhash Khude 
 Ankush Mandekar 
 Mauli Purane 
 Dilip Shende 
 Nandkishor Gore

References

2010s Marathi-language films